Robyn Johannes (born 23 August 1986) is a South African professional soccer player who most recently played as a defender and was the former captain of Stellenbosch FC in the Premier Soccer League.

Robyn, born in Strandfontein, Mitchell's Plain, played youth football with Parkhurst Ambassadors, Hellenic FC and Rygersdal FC before starting his professional career with University of Pretoria. He made his PSL debut with Mamelodi Sundowns. He is known for his exceptional passing range, composure and leadership. Robyn Johannes has won all domestic trophies.

Club career

University of Pretoria 
Robyn joined Tuks Football Academy. "[...] he left the Mother city to join the University of Pretoria youth set-up at the tender age of 15." He was part of University of Pretoria promotion from Castle League to Vodacom League and then to the National First Division, where he was captain of the team.

Mamelodi Sundowns 
Robyn signed with Mamelodi Sundowns in 2004, where he made his first PSL debut. His 5 year spell at the club was highly successful. The team won two league titles in 2005-06 and 2006-07. He played his first cup final at the Netbank Cup, winning against Mpumalanga Black Aces in 2008. In addition, he appeared in the CAF Champions League.

In 2006, Robyn tore his ACL during a match, which left him on the sidelines for a year.

Orlando Pirates 
Robyn transferred to Orlando Pirates in 2010. In his first season, the team won the treble under manager Dutch legend Ruud Krol. "Orlando Pirates completed a historic treble by beating second-tier Black Leopards 3-1 in the South African FA Cup final in Nelspruit."

Golden Arrows 
In 2011, Robyn was on loan for the remaining of the season at Golden Arrows.

Maritzburg United 
Robyn spent a season at Maritzburg United in 2013, where he endured a series of injuries that left him unable to play many games.

AmaZulu 
Robyn signed with AmaZulu in 2015. After a challenging season, the club got relegated. Robyn played one season.

Cape Town City 
In 2016, Johannes signed with reformed team Cape Town City by manager Eric Tinkler. "[...] the former Orlando Pirates man has put pen to paper on a two-year deal with the Cape side". The team's first season was triumphant, winning the 2016 Telkom Knockout cup, as well as achieving third place in the log. The following year, South African football legend Benni McCarthy was appointed manager at the club. In 2017, the centre-back was named captain.  In 2017, the Citizens were runners-up in the MTN8.

Bidvest Wits 
Robyn joined multiple league winner coach Gavin Hunt in 2018.

Stellenbosch FC 
The defender transferred in 2019 to newly promoted Stellenbosch FC.  Johannes signed a two-year deal with an option to renew for a further year. Robyn was appointed captain in season 2020-21. On the 25th of October 2020, Robyn scored a penalty goal against Moroka Swallows. 

“Robyn Johannes stole the show last night winning the Players Player of the year as well as the Footballer of the Year Award."

International career
He made his international debut in a COSAFA Cup match against the Seychelles on 26 February 2005.

Style of play 
Robyn is known for his excellent passing range, continuously packing high scores. "Cape Town City’s Robyn Johannes continues to have the highest passing accuracy in the Absa Premiership, with a few Orlando Pirates players following behind on the charts. Johannes is currently topping the charts with his accuracy on 93.1 %."

Personal life 
Robyn married his fiancée in 2020 and welcomed a son in 2021.

References

External links
 
 

1986 births
South African soccer players
Living people
Sportspeople from Cape Town
Association football central defenders
Mamelodi Sundowns F.C. players
Cape Coloureds
University of Pretoria F.C. players
South Africa international soccer players
Orlando Pirates F.C. players
Maritzburg United F.C. players
AmaZulu F.C. players
Cape Town City F.C. (2016) players
Lamontville Golden Arrows F.C. players
Bidvest Wits F.C. players
Stellenbosch F.C. players
South African Premier Division players